Venkatramanan Anantha Nageswaran (born in 1963) is an Indian economist and the 18th Chief Economic Advisor to the Government of India.   He served as the global Chief Investment Officer at Bank Julius Baer in Switzerland after serving as its Head of Research for Asia. Prior to this, he worked for Credit Suisse in Switzerland and Singapore, and for the Union Bank of Switzerland (now UBS). He has served as the Dean of IFMR Graduate School of Business, as a professor for graduate students at the Singapore Management University, and at the Indian Institute of Management Bangalore & Indian Institute of Management Indore.

Early life and education 
Nageswaran completed his schooling education in Railway Mixed Higher School (RMHSS), Madurai. In 1983 Nageswaran graduated from American College, Madurai and in 1986 he obtained his Masters in Business Administration from Indian Institute of Management (IIM), Ahmedabad. He later earned Doctor of Philosophy in finance from Isenberg School of Management at University of Massachusetts Amherst in 1994 for his research about 'Empirical behavior of Exchange Rates'

Career 
In his corporate career spanning seventeen years from 1994 to 2011, he was a Currency Economist at the Union Bank of Switzerland , Head of Research and Investment Consulting in Credit Suisse Private Banking in Asia, head of Asia Research and then Global Chief Investment Officer at Bank Julius Baer, Switzerland

He was the Dean of the IFMR Graduate School of Business and a visiting professor of economics at Krea University. Nageswaran has been an adjunct faculty with the Singapore Management University and with the Wealth Management Institute at the Nanyang Technological University.

He was a member of the board of directors at TVS supply chain and Sundaram Fasteners and served on the advisory boards of TVS Capital and Global Alliance for Mass Entrepreneurship (GAME). He was appointed as an honorary advisor to Indian Financial Services Authority.

He is the co founder of the Aavishkaar India Micro Venture Capital fund, a pioneer in impact investing, and the Takshashila Institute, a think tank for research and education in Public Policy.

He was a part time member of Prime Minister's Economic Advisory Council from 2019 to 2021.

On 28 January 2022, He was appointed as the Chief Economic Advisor of Government of India succeeding Krishnamurthy Subramanian, who completed his three-year term in December 2021.

Bibliography

 Economics of Derivatives (March 2015), Cambridge University Press. Co-authored with T. V. Somanathan
 Can India Grow?: Challenges, Opportunities, and the Way Forward (November 2016), Carnegie Endowment for International Peace. Co-authored with Gulzar Natarajan.
 Derivatives (October 2017), Cambridge University Press. Co-authored with T. V. Somanathan.
 The Rise of Finance: Causes, Consequences and Cures (April 2019), Cambridge University Press. Co-authored with Gulzar Natarajan.

References 

20th-century Indian economists
Living people
21st-century Indian economists
Indian Institute of Management Ahmedabad alumni
Isenberg School of Management alumni
University of Massachusetts Amherst alumni
Chief Economic Advisers to the Government of India
Academic staff of Krea University
1962 births
Academic staff of Singapore Management University